Herpetopoma exasperatum is a species of sea snail, a marine gastropod mollusk in the family Chilodontidae.

Description
The size of the shell varies between 5 mm and 10 mm.

Distribution
This marine species occurs off the Philippines, Eastern Thailand and Northern Java, Indonesia

References

External links
 To Encyclopedia of Life
 To World Register of Marine Species
 

exasperata
Gastropods described in 1853